Ralph L. Mayhood (November 22, 1909 – January 18, 1978) was an American businessman and politician.

Mayhood was born on a farm near Eyota, Minnesota. He graduated from Rochester High School in Rochester, Minnesota. He went to University of Minnesota, Minnesota College of Law (now William Mitchell College of Law), and Northwestern University. Mayhood lived in Minneapolis, Minnesota. He served in the Minnesota House of Representatives in 1941 and 1942 and in the Minnesota Senate from 1943 to 1958. He served as the Hennepin County Sheriff and was the administrator of the Samaritan Nursing Home in Minneapolis and had owned nursing homes. Mayhodd was beaten to death in an apartment he owned in Minneapolis.

References

1909 births
1978 deaths
1978 murders in the United States
People from Eyota, Minnesota
Businesspeople from Minneapolis
Politicians from Minneapolis
Northwestern University alumni
University of Minnesota alumni
William Mitchell College of Law alumni
People murdered in Minnesota
Members of the Minnesota House of Representatives
Minnesota state senators
Minnesota sheriffs